Kim Byeong-ok (born October 11, 1960) is a South Korean actor. A veteran supporting actor, he is best known for his role as Mr. Han in Oldboy.

Career 

In 2015, he was featured in a controversial Maxim Korea cover, standing next to a car smoking a cigarette with a woman's legs bound in duct tape protruding from the car's trunk.

Filmography

Film

Television series

References

External links 
 
 
 

Living people
South Korean male television actors
South Korean male film actors
South Korean male web series actors
1960 births
20th-century South Korean male actors
21st-century South Korean male actors